Ioannis Vourakis was a Greek shooter.  He competed at the 1896 Summer Olympics in Athens. Vourakis competed in the free rifle event despite not finishing the competition.

References

External links

19th-century births
20th-century deaths
Greek male sport shooters
Olympic shooters of Greece
Shooters at the 1896 Summer Olympics
19th-century sportsmen
Year of birth missing
Year of death missing
Place of birth missing
Place of death missing